North Sanpete High School is a public high school serving grades 9 through 12, located in Mount Pleasant, Utah, United States.  The school is the only high school serving the North Sanpete School District.

Notable alumni
Vasco M. Tanner - entomologist
Spencer Cox, Lieutenant Governor of Utah
Junior Ioane - NFL football player

References

External links
Official school website

Public high schools in Utah
Educational institutions established in 1912
Schools in Sanpete County, Utah
1912 establishments in Utah